Neodymium phosphide is an inorganic compound of neodymium and phosphorus with the chemical formula NdP.

Preparation
Neodymium phosphide can be obtained by reacting neodymium and phosphorus in a stoichiometric ratio:
 4Nd + P4 -> 4NdP

Physical properties
Neodymium phosphide forms cubic crystals, space group Fmm, cell parameters a = 0.5838 nm, Z = 4.

Uses
The compound is a semiconductor used in high power, high frequency applications, and in laser diodes.

References

Phosphides
Neodymium compounds
Semiconductors
Rock salt crystal structure